The New Life of Paul Sneijder is a 2016 drama film, directed by Thomas Vincent. It is a co-production of Canada and France.

Based on the novel Le cas Sneijder by Jean-Paul Dubois, the film stars Thierry Lhermitte as Paul Sneijder, a man who is injured in an elevator accident which has also killed his daughter. Suffering an existential crisis which leads him to question the values on which he has based his life, he begins to rebuild his spirit by taking a new job as a dog walker. The film's cast also includes Géraldine Pailhas, Pierre Curzi, Guillaume Cyr and Aliocha Schneider. It was filmed on Nuns' Island, Montreal.

Cyr garnered a Prix Iris nomination for Best Supporting Actor at the 19th Quebec Cinema Awards in 2017.

References

External links
 

2016 films
Canadian drama films
Quebec films
French drama films
Films shot in Montreal
French-language Canadian films
2010s Canadian films
2010s French films